Project Pinball Charity is a nonprofit 501(c)(3) that places pinball machines in children's hospitals to provide recreational relief to patients, family members, and staff. Operating out of Bonita Springs, Florida since 2011 Project Pinball has donated 53 pinball machines to 49 hospitals spanning 24 states.

History 
Project Pinball Charity was founded on August 19, 2013 by Daniel Spolar. Spolar noticed an inoperable 2007 Spider-Man Pinball Machine in Golisano Children's Hospital and offered to fix it.  After repairing the machine and discovering it had been played over 21,300 times in two years, Spolar went on to found Project Pinball Charity to assist other children's hospitals in their patient rehabilitation. Since then they have been assisted by pinball manufacturers such as Stern, Jersey Jack Pinball, and Visual Pinball to donate machines to 49 different hospitals in 41 states. In 2020 the charity's annual Love Across America Tour dedicated 8 machines in 14 days including one in Cincinnati, Ohio with the help of local celebrity Fluke Skywalker and another in Columbia, South Carolina.

Project Pinball Charity has a Gold rating from Guidestar.

Hospital donations 
Project Pinball has donated 53 pinball machines placed in 49 children’s hospitals and 24 states including Children's Hospital Colorado, Sunrise Children's Hospital, Children's Hospital Los Angeles, UNC Children's Hospital, Johns Hopkins Children's Center, Baptist Hospital of Southeast Texas, Nationwide Children's Hospital, Children's Hospital and Medical Center of Omaha, UCSF Benioff Children's Hospital San Francisco, MassGeneral Hospital for Children, Advocate Children's Hospital, Palm Beach Children's Hospital, K.Hovnanian Children's Hospital, St. Louis Children's Hospital, Wesley Children's Hospital and Golisano Children's Hospital of Southwest Florida.

References 

Non-profit organizations based in Florida
Pinball